In mathematics, the Néron–Ogg–Shafarevich criterion states that if A is an elliptic curve or abelian variety  over a local field K and ℓ is a prime  not dividing the characteristic of the residue field of K then A has good reduction if and only if the ℓ-adic Tate module Tℓ of A is unramified.  introduced the criterion for elliptic curves.  used the results of  to extend it to abelian varieties,
and named the criterion after Ogg, Néron and Igor Shafarevich (commenting that Ogg's result seems to have been known to Shafarevich).

References

Abelian varieties
Elliptic curves
Theorems in algebraic geometry
Arithmetic geometry